A solid immersion lens (SIL) has higher magnification and higher numerical aperture than common lenses by filling the object space with a high-refractive-index solid material.  SIL was originally developed for enhancing the spatial resolution of optical microscopy. There are two types of SIL:

Applications of SIL

Solid immersion lens microscopy 
All optical microscopes are diffraction-limited because of the wave nature of light.  Current research focuses on techniques to go beyond this limit known as the Rayleigh criterion. The use of SIL can achieve spatial resolution better than the diffraction limit in air, for both far-field imaging  and near-field imaging.

Optical data storage
Because SIL provides high spatial resolution, the spot size of laser beam through the SIL can be smaller than diffraction limit in air, and the density of the associated optical data storage can be increased.

Photolithography
Similar to immersion lithography, the use of SIL can increase spatial resolution of projected photolithographic patterns, creating smaller components on wafers.

Emission Microscopy

Offers advantages for semiconductor wafer emission microscopy which detects faint emissions of light (Photons) from electron-hole recombination under the influence of electrical stimulation.

References 

Microscope components
Lenses
Heat-assisted magnetic recording